Mercamadrid is the main wholesale market of fresh products in Spain. Located in Madrid, it is a public enterprise jointly participated by the Ayuntamiento de Madrid and Mercasa, part of the SEPI.

Located in Villa de Vallecas, next to the M-40, in Southeastern Madrid, it covers an area of 2.22 km2. A dry land fish market, it is one of the biggest fish markets in the world. Serving an area of influence within a 500 km radius, it feeds roughly 12 million people. It has more than 9,000 employees operating through more than 800 companies.

It traces its origins back to 1982, when the Central Market of Fish was inaugurated. The Central Market of Fruits and Edible Plants soon followed (1983).

References 

 Informational notes

 Citations

Wholesale markets in Spain
Economy of Madrid
Government of Madrid
Logistics in Spain